The women's triple jump event  at the 1998 European Athletics Indoor Championships was held on 27–28 February.

Medalists

Results

Qualification
Qualification performance: 14.00 (Q) or at least 12 best performers (q) advanced to the final.

Final

References

Qualification results
Final results

Triple jump at the European Athletics Indoor Championships
Triple
1998 in women's athletics